McWane, Inc. is one of the world's largest manufacturers of iron water works and plumbing products and one of America's largest privately owned companies. The company manufactures a host of different products including ductile iron pipe and fittings, cast iron soil pipe and fittings, heavy duty couplings, utility poles, network switches and monitoring equipment, and related products. McWane is also a manufacturer of pressurized cylinders for the storage of propane and other gases through its Manchester Tank and Equipment Company division, and fire protection systems and extinguishers through its Amerex subsidiary.

Based in Birmingham, Alabama, McWane is a family owned company employing more than 6,900 team members in over 25 manufacturing locations worldwide. In addition to the United States, the company has international operations in Australia, Canada, Chile, China, South Korea, India, Norway and the United Arab Emirates. Its products are used in Afghanistan, India and across Asia and the Pacific, throughout Europe, South America and nearly everywhere in North America. Its operating revenues were estimated at approximately $1.5 to 2 billion .

History 
J. R. McWane founded the McWane Cast Iron Pipe Company in 1921 in Birmingham, Alabama, where it has maintained its headquarters since. McWane introduced innovations to foundry technology and processes. He also introduced progressive initiatives to improve working conditions. In 1920, one year before the founding of McWane, J.R. McWane wrote, "The industry that maintains an army of workers without regard to their working and living conditions, their health, recreations, religious and social life cannot succeed in the largest sense." His vision is referred to within the company as "The McWane Way", and can be summarized as aiming to improve both the methods of work and the lives of the workers, rather than focusing only on financial loss.

In 2006, McWane's Atlantic States plant in New Jersey became the first foundry in North America to apply technology to substantially limit mercury emissions. The following year, a McWane plant, Clow Valve Company in Oskaloosa, Iowa, was the first iron and brass foundry in the country to be recognized as a Voluntary Protection Program site by OSHA.

Growth and expansion

Domestic acquisitions 
The company has grown mainly through acquisition of other domestic foundries and related enterprises. In 1926, the company opened its first subsidiary, the Pacific States Cast Iron Pipe Company. Later, McWane acquired Empire Coke Company in 1962, Atlantic States Cast Iron Pipe Company in 1975, and Union Foundry Company in 1977. Between 1984 and 1996, the company continued its expansion with the acquisition of the following companies, M&H Valve Company, Clow Water Systems, Clow Valve Company, Kennedy Valve Company, Tyler Pipe and Anaco. In 1999, McWane bought two more companies: Manchester Tank & Equipment of Brentwood, Tennessee and Amerex Corporation of Trussville, Alabama, expanding its manufacturing of fire extinguishers. In 2008, McWane Poles developed a new product for the electric utility industry that is used by companies including the Florida Key Electric Cooperative. Then, in 2012, McWane entered into the technology industry by adding Synapse Wireless and Nighthawk, a provider for wireless smart grid solutions.

International expansion
McWane's international expansion began in 1989 when it acquired Canada Pipe Company, in Hamilton, Ontario, an iron pipe plant owned by Canron Inc. of Toronto, Ontario. After entering the Canadian market in 1989, McWane established Clow Canada in 1990, with manufacturing operations in Saint John, New Brunswick. The Saint John operation had operated as Thomas McAvity & Company between 1834 and 1960 before it was sold to Crane Canada Ltd. Through Canada Pipe, McWane also acquired the Bibby Companies in 1997. McWane then extended its operations to Australia in 1999 with the acquisition of Manchester Tank & Equipment Company. In 2005, the company built a new foundry, the Tyler Xian Xian Foundry Company, in Hebei, China and in 2010, McWane acquired Manchester Tank & Equipment Cemcogas SA in Santiago, Chile. Additionally, through Amerex, McWane acquired Solberg Scandinavian AS, an independent firefighting foam agent manufacturer based in Bergen, Norway. In 2012, McWane moved into the technology space by adding ComTech Korea, based in Seoul, and Ontario-based Futurecom, and added UK-based Zinwave in 2014. Their most recent international expansion came in 2015, when it opened its first manufacturing plant in Abu Dhabi, called McWane Gulf.

China 
In 2003, in response to increasing pressure to move operations overseas due to competition from importers, McWane filed a petition with the International Trade Commission asking for relief from Chinese competition. The commission unanimously approved McWane's petition and recommended that President George W. Bush impose a three-year import quota on China's waterworks fittings and tariffs of up to 50 percent on imports exceeding the quota. However, in March 2004, President Bush decided not to adopt the commission's recommendation. Following this decision, McWane opted to begin manufacturing its products both domestically and overseas. To that end, in 2005, it opened a plant in China's Hebei Province. The company was named the "Excellent Environmental Protection Facility of 2006" by the Cangzhou Environmental Protection Bureau.

Environmental and safety issues 
Following McWane's rapid growth in the 1990s, it was reported that the company had an increased number of health and safety violations. In 2002, the New York Times and others revealed serious workplace safety and environmental violations leading to fines and criminal convictions. In 2003, a series of joint print and broadcast reports by the New York Times, PBS and Canadian Broadcast Corporation reported serious safety and environmental problems at McWane plants. According to the reports, there were 4,600 recorded injuries, nine deaths and more than 400 Occupational Safety and Health Administration violations between 1995 and 2003.

Criminal and civil violations

Following the media reports, the Justice Department and the Environmental Protection Agency (EPA) launched an intensive investigation into McWane's safety and environmental practices. Federal regulators brought formal charges against McWane facilities and managers, resulting in $25 million in fines and prison sentences of up to 70 months for four McWane plant managers. Regulators also charged McWane with more than 400 air and water quality violations. The company resolved the bulk of the environmental violations in 2010, when it agreed to pay $4 million in civil penalties and spend another $9.1 million on environmental projects in communities near its plants. This agreement covered 28 of the company's manufacturing facilities in 14 states, and resolves violations including the Clean Air Act. the Clean Water Act, the Emergency Planning and Community Right-to-Know Act, Toxic Substances Control Act, the Safe Drinking Water Act, and three other federal acts. McWane President Ruffner Page Jr. said the agreement was "the beginning of the final chapter" in McWane's effort to be in full compliance.

PBS Frontline aired an updated version of "A Dangerous Business", entitled "A Dangerous Business Revisited", on 5 February 2008 on most PBS stations throughout the U.S. Included in this version was additional reporting regarding federal prosecutions against McWane, Inc. since the original airing, as well as checking the OSHA data to verify whether McWane, Inc.'s new safety standards have made working conditions truly safer for its foundry employees.

Commitment to safety and environment
Prior to the media reports, the company had been implementing changes to its operating practices since 2000, according to McWane's president, G. Ruffner Page. Following the 2003 investigations, McWane continued to reform its safety and environmental practices, bringing on new management and implementing new safety procedures. The company replaced 90 percent of its senior management and added 125 new environmental, health and safety, and human resources positions since 1999. In addition, McWane spent over $300 million on environmental protection and health and safety (EHS), and implemented a centralised EHS management system to detect environmental, and health and safety problems. It also began self-reporting oversights to authorities. McWane updated its Ethics and Compliance Policy and created a training and educational program for EHS and management skills. To ensure legal compliance, the company implemented oversight mechanisms and incentive schemes, including internal and external (third party) audits and a financial incentive program for managers based upon EHS performance, an appropriate range of disciplinary actions for noncompliance, along with a confidential, 24-hour phone line for reporting suspected violations and other concerns.

Independent review and recognition
In a 2006 letter to the EPA, international president of the United Steelworkers Leo Gerard wrote that McWane's current management "has shown a dramatic change in attitude" and that "current safely practices at McWane are as good as or better than any of its competitors." During sentencing of the company in a case regarding environmental damages in New Jersey, U.S. District Court Judge Mary Cooper concluded, "A night and day difference has been accomplished, not by wishful thinking, but by determined and sustained effort at all levels. They are determined to continue to serve in all the ways that they serve and to do everything they can to prevent environmental, health, and safety damage to anyone."

As a result of the changes implemented by McWane, the company, and its operating divisions and subsidiaries have received local and national recognition and awards. The company's Union Foundry has won safety awards, including Alabama's highest safety award from the Alabama Department of Industrial Relations. The company's Pacific States plant received both the Utah Department of Environmental Quality's Outstanding Achievement in Pollution Prevention Award and the Provo/Orem Chamber of Commerce's "Business of the Year" award in 2007. In 2008, the Birmingham Business Journal named McWane president G. Ruffner Page as its Green Business Leader of the Year. , seven McWane plants have been admitted into OSHA's Voluntary Protection Program (VPP), a program that recognizes exemplary health and safety programs, and a status that fewer than 1% of all U.S. workplaces attain.

Philanthropy 

The McWane family and company is noted for its charitable work in Alabama and in communities where its plants are located. The family pledged $10 million to the McWane Science Center, and they have also donated to cultural institutions such as the Birmingham Civil Rights Institute. The company offers undergraduate scholarships to Alabama college students. The McWane family also donated $2 million to the 1999 restoration of the Birmingham's famous Vulcan statue, which was originally cast in 1904 by J. R. McWane's foundry and is the largest cast iron statue in the world. The Alabama Chapter of Fundraising Professionals awarded McWane its Outstanding Corporate Citizen of the Year Award in 2005. The city of Birmingham has also recognized McWane several times for its beautification and summer arts programs. In 2009, the McWane Foundation pledged $5 million to Alabama's Children's Hospital for the construction of an environmentally friendly hospital. In addition to the gift from the McWane Foundation, Phillip and Heather McWane personally pledged an additional $5 million for a clinical program in the new hospital.

Outside of Alabama, McWane's subsidiaries have contributed to charitable causes and community resources, including a $30,000 donation to the Community Health and Mahaska Hospice for the renovation of the former Family Medical Center building, now called the Mahaska Health West building by the Clow Valve Company. In 2008, the Atlantic States Cast Iron Pipe Co. donated $75,000 to upgrade the Walters Park band shell in Phillipsburg, New Jersey.

According to Federal Election Commission data, McWane Inc. was the top contributor to then-Senator Jeff Sessions' campaign committee from 2011 to 2016.

See also
Birmingham District
Cast iron
Cast-iron architecture
Foundry

References

External links

New York Times coverage of McWane
U.S. Department of Justice - U.S. v. McWane Corp.
Historic American Engineering Record (HAER) documentation, filed under 1201 Vanderbilt Road, Birmingham, Jefferson County, AL:

1921 establishments in Alabama
Companies based in Birmingham, Alabama
Historic American Engineering Record in Alabama
Manufacturing companies established in 1921
Privately held companies based in Alabama